Amphicyclotulus is a genus of tropical land snails with gills and an operculum, terrestrial gastropod mollusks in the family Neocyclotidae (according to the taxonomy of the Gastropoda by Bouchet & Rocroi, 2005).

Species
Species within the genus Amphicyclotulus include:
 Amphicyclotulus amethystinus (Guppy, 1868) - synonym: Amphicyclotulus mineri Bartsch, 1942
 Amphicyclotulus beauianus (Petit, 1853)
 Amphicyclotulus dominicensis Bartsch, 1942
 Amphicyclotulus guadeloupensis de la Torre, Bartsch & Morrison, 1942
 Amphicyclotulus liratus Droüet, 1859
 Amphicyclotulus perplexus de la Torre, Bartsch & Morrison, 1942
 Amphicyclotulus rufescens
 Amphicyclotulus schrammi (Shuttleworth, 1857)

See also 
 Amphicyclotus is a different genus in the same family Neocyclotidae.

References

Neocyclotidae